Several Royal Norwegian Navy ships and a class of torpedo boats have been named Snøgg.

  - a torpedo boat built in 1919 and captured by the Germans during the German invasion of Norway in 1940.
 The s - Six vessels built in 1970 and 1971.
 A Snøgg-class missile torpedo boat  which was in service from 1970 to 1994.

Royal Norwegian Navy ship names